Find Your Own Way Home is the fifteenth studio album by REO Speedwagon. It was produced by Joe Vannelli and Kevin Cronin and was released in 2007 by Speedwagon Recordings and Mailboat Records. The album came eleven years after the band's previous studio album, Building the Bridge. The album found the band returning to its trademark hard rock sound after the soft ballads of Bridge. Though the album did not chart, it did produce the minor hit "I Needed to Fall", which peaked at #25 on the Billboard Adult Contemporary chart. "Smilin' in the End" was released at the same time as "I Needed to Fall" to classic rock stations, but did not chart. The third single from the album, the title track, reached #23 on the Billboard Adult Contemporary Chart.

Also released in a limited edition package including XM Artist Confidential, a live DVD recorded at the XM Performance Theatre in Washington, D.C., and the live CD Hi Infidelity Then Again...Live, also recorded at the same venue. The CD also includes enhanced video content.

Track listing

Find Your Own Way Home

(+) Previously unreleased acoustic versions

XM Artist Confidential DVD

Hi Infidelity Then Again...Live

Personnel 

REO Speedwagon
 Kevin Cronin – lead vocals (1-8, 10), backing vocals, acoustic guitar, rhythm guitars
 Dave Amato – lead guitars, electric guitars, backing vocals
 Neal Doughty – synthesizers, Hammond organ (1)
 Bruce Hall – bass, backing vocals, lead vocals (9)
 Bryan Hitt – drums, percussion 

Additional personnel
 Joe Vannelli – acoustic piano (2, 3, 9, 10), Hammond organ (2, 9), virtual strings (2, 3, 6, 10), electric piano (5, 7, 8), synthesizers (8)

Release history

References

REO Speedwagon albums
2007 albums
Mailboat Records albums
Albums produced by Kevin Cronin